Max Hiller (8 December 1889 – 17 December 1948) was a German stage and film actor. He appeared in more than thirty films from 1917 to 1948.

Selected filmography

References

External links 

1889 births
1948 deaths
German male film actors
German male stage actors
German male silent film actors
Male actors from Berlin
20th-century German male actors